M. K. Sankaran Namboothiri (a.k.a. Pranavam Sankaran Namboothiri) (born 1971) is a Carnatic classical music vocalist and playback singer from Kerala. He is the youngest A Top grade vocalist with All India Radio. Renowned as a child prodigy, he started learning music at the age of ten under the tutelage of C. S. Narayanan Namboothiri. He later trained under T. V. Gopalakrishnan, Mavelikkara Prabhakara Varma, and K. V. Narayanaswamy.

He has conducted concerts in India as well as many foreign countries.

Personal life
Sankaran Namboothiri was born to Krishnan Namboothiri  (Kathakali singer) and Adithi Devi Antharjanom (Madom Illam, Punnayam) in the year 1971. His native place is 'Punnayam' (asamannoor village). He has two elder brothers, Krishnan Namboothiri (Retired Deputy Tahasildar, perumbavoor) and Narayanan Namboothiri (college lecturer BTB college, Palakkad)

He is married to Ms. Smitha Shankaran from Cherthala and they have a child named Sangeeth Krishnan. Currently lives in Vennala, Cochin.

Awards
 Kerala Sangeetha Nataka Akademi Award (2013)
 Isai – Pulamai Selvan by Lions Club International, Madras in 1984
 Kala Prathibha by M G University, Kerala in 1987
 Ganamrutha Surabi by Sree Vidya Peedam Kaladaikurichi, Tirunelveli, Tamil Nadu
 Isai Mamani by Harinagar Tamil Association, New Delhi in 1990
 Yuvakala Bharathi by Bharath Kalachar, Chennai in 1995
 Lifetime achievement award by United Writers' Association, Chennai in 2000
 Thulasivana Puraskar by Thulasivana Sangeetha Parishath, 2000
 Best Play Back Singer Award from Gandhi Study Center, Doordarshan Kendra and Raagom Cultural Center in 2008 for the song "Chittattinkaavil" from the film "Nivedyam"

Film songs

Malayalam Album Songs
Pranayamarmaram – 2009.
Bhagwan Sri Sathya Sai Sapthathi – 2008.
Jai Jai Bhairavi Carnatic Krithis – 2008.

External links
Official website

References

Male Carnatic singers
Carnatic singers
Living people
Singers from Kochi
Malayalam playback singers
1971 births
Indian male playback singers
Recipients of the Kerala Sangeetha Nataka Akademi Award